is a 1958 Japanese tokusatsu fantasy drama film directed by Kazuo Mori, and written by Shigeo Okamoto. It is the seventh entry in the Suzunosuke Akado film series, after Suzunosuke Akado: The One-Legged Demon, which was released the previous year. Suzunosuke Akado: The Birdman with Three Eyes stars Shoji Umewaka, Tamao Nakamura, Yatarō Kurokawa, and Ryūzaburō Mitsuoka. The film was followed by Suzunosuke Akado: The Thunder Man of Kurokumo Valley, released in the same year on November 15.

Plot 
A three-eyed birdman appears in the town of Edo kidnapping children Suzunosuke Akado (Shoji Umewaka) must defeat the birdman before he turns the town into chaos.

Cast

Release 
Suzunosuke Akado: The Birdman with Three Eyes was released in Japan on March 11, 1958 and re-released in Japan on July 17, 1971 as a double feature with Gamera vs. Zigra.

The film was released on DVD by Victor Film on December 20, 2002.

Notes

References

Footnotes

Sources

External links 

 
 

1958 films
1950s fantasy films
Daiei Film films
Films directed by Kazuo Mori
Japanese sequel films
Japanese science fiction films
1950s science fiction films
Daiei Film tokusatsu films
1950s Japanese films